Geholaspis berlesei is a species of mite in the family Macrochelidae.

References

Macrochelidae
Articles created by Qbugbot
Animals described in 1953